"Don't It Make My Brown Eyes Blue" is a song written by Richard Leigh, and recorded by American country music singer Crystal Gayle.  It was released in June 1977 as the first single from Gayle's album We Must Believe in Magic.

Background
"Don't It Make My Brown Eyes Blue" composer Richard Leigh had been responsible for all three of Crystal Gayle's previous Top Ten C&W hits, the third of which "I'll Get Over You" had reached number 1. According to Gayle's regular producer Allen Reynolds, he was advised by Leigh's landlady, songwriter Sandy Mason Theoret, that Leigh was "a little down in the dumps lately because nothing much [was] happening" after the success of "I'll Get Over You". At Theoret's suggestion, Reynolds visited Leigh to cheer him up. Reynolds  explained, "we were sittin' on the floor...singing songs to one another. [Leigh] mentioned a song that his publisher was gonna get to Shirley Bassey...[and] sang it for me: 'Don't It Make My Brown Eyes Blue'. I said, 'Shirley Bassey my ass, I want that song!'" Reynolds recalls that when he played "Don't It Make My Brown Eyes Blue" for Gayle "she was just as excited [by the song] as I was."

The track was recorded at Jack's Tracks in Nashville on  October 27, 1976.  As Reynolds' regular session keyboardist Charles Cochran had suffered a stroke with some resultant numbness in his hands, Reynolds hired Hargus "Pig" Robbins to play keyboards, and Robbins instantly devised the song's signature acoustic piano riff; Cochran was also featured on the session playing the horn parts on a Wurlitzer. Reynolds noted "it was just one of those charmed sessions...[After] we presented the song to the musicians...it was about the third time running [through] that song that we ran tape...[Gayle] sang [the song] wonderfully. It came so fast that she wasn't sure that she had done her best job. I had to let her try to sing it again on two or three different occasions until she was comfortable with the original [vocal take], and that's what we went with. Everything on that recording was the original take as it went down, except the string section I added later."

In a 2004 Country Music Television interview, Gayle stated that Leigh wrote the song because his dog had one brown eye and one blue eye. However, in a 2016 interview, Richard Leigh set the record straight and said that this was not the case. His dog, Amanda, a terrier, had two brown eyes.

Critical reception
The song became a worldwide hit single. In the United States, it topped the Billboard country music chart for four weeks, and was Gayle's first (and biggest) crossover pop hit, reaching number 1 on the Cashbox Top 100 for two weeks, and number 2 on the Billboard Hot 100 for three weeks, blocked from the top spot by Debby Boone's smash hit, "You Light Up My Life". The album received Platinum status, the first by a female country singer. The song became Gayle's signature piece throughout her career. In 1978, the song won Gayle a Grammy Award for Best Female Country Vocal Performance. In 1999, the song was recognized by ASCAP as one of the ten most-performed songs of the 20th century.  The song has a jazzy feel to it when compared to many other country songs of that era. Gayle had many more hit singles for the next ten years, such as "Talking in Your Sleep", "Half the Way" "You and I" (a duet with Eddie Rabbitt) and "I'll Get Over You", but none have achieved the same level of success as "Don't It Make My Brown Eyes Blue".

Cover versions
The song has been covered by Lorrae Desmond, Laura Fygi, Anita Meyer, the Nolans, Tessanne Chin, Dolly Parton, Alison Statton (aka Devine & Statton), Wendy Van Wanten, and Dana Winner. Mireille Mathieu recorded the song first in French as "Un peu de bleu" in 1977 then in German as "Tränen Würden Mir Nicht Stehn" in 1980, another French rendering "Mes yeux bleus sont gris" was recorded by Michèle Torr, Matell, and a Cantonese version titled "你說是甜我說苦 (You Say it is Sweet, I say it is Bitter)" was recorded by Prudence Liew for her Jokingly Saying album. Lenka Filipová in Czech version Vraní blues for her album Zamilovaná in 1981.

Chart performance

Weekly singles charts

Year-end charts

See also
 List of Cash Box Top 100 number-one singles of 1977

References

External links
[ Song review from AllMusic]

1977 songs
Crystal Gayle songs
The Nolans songs
Songs written by Richard Leigh (songwriter)
Song recordings produced by Allen Reynolds
1977 singles
United Artists Records singles
1970s ballads
Torch songs
Cashbox number-one singles
RPM Top Singles number-one singles
Eye color